Ante Guberina (born 24 February 1940) is a Croatian rower. He competed in the men's coxed pair event at the 1964 Summer Olympics.

References

1940 births
Living people
Croatian male rowers
Olympic rowers of Yugoslavia
Rowers at the 1964 Summer Olympics
Sportspeople from Šibenik